Ahmed Saifi is a Pakistani cricketer. He made his List A debut for Sui Northern Gas Pipelines Limited in the 2015–16 National One Day Cup on 22 January 2016. He made his first-class debut for Sui Northern Gas Pipelines Limited in the 2016–17 Quaid-e-Azam Trophy on 12 November 2016.

References

External links
 

Year of birth missing (living people)
Living people
Pakistani cricketers
Sui Northern Gas Pipelines Limited cricketers
Place of birth missing (living people)